Pussella is a village situated about 8 km away from Mawathagama in Sri Lanka.

Populated places in Kegalle District